The Englishtown Ferry is a cable ferry carrying Nova Scotia Route 312 across the mouth of St. Ann's Bay. The ferry route runs 24 hours a day, on demand, and takes only a few minutes to cross the  channel. On 25 March 2013, an 81-year-old man was killed after driving his car off the end of the ferry during boarding and plunging into the cold, swiftly-moving waters.

In 2014, the Province of Nova Scotia, operator of the ferry, announced that it was investigating the economic implications of replacing the ferry with a bridge.

References

Ferries of Nova Scotia
Cable ferries in Canada